Uma Regmi, is a Nepali politician and former Minister for Women, Children and Senior Citizens of Nepal. She is a member of House of Representatives selected through PR  (proportional representation) system, belongs to the Nepali Congress party. Regmi is also the current President of the Nepal Women Association (NWA) which is a sister wing of Nepali Congress.

References

1954 births
Living people
Nepal MPs 2017–2022
Nepali Congress politicians from Bagmati Province
Government ministers of Nepal
Women government ministers of Nepal
Nepal MPs 1991–1994
Members of the 1st Nepalese Constituent Assembly